The 1956 New Zealand Māori rugby league tour of Australia was the fourth overseas tour by a Māori rugby league team. The previous three tours were also to Australia. There had been tours in both 1908 and 1909 during the code’s formative years. The third tour occurred in 1922. 
In the rival code, New Zealand Māori Rugby Union teams had undertaken taken three tours since the conclusion of World War II: to Fiji in 1948 and 1954, and to Australia in 1949.  
In Rugby League, Māori teams had played touring teams in 1946, 1949, 1953, 1954 and 1955. 
This Māori tour, which began on August 1, followed a tour by the New Zealand national team which had concluded in early July. Two players, Henry Maxwell and Mauriohooho (Joe) Murray participated in both tours. Simon Yates was on the Māori tour, whilst his brother John Yates had been on the Kiwis tour. 
The October 1955 issue of the Rugby League News mentioned the prospect of a Māori tour to Australia. The December 1955 issue included a draft itinerary.

Leadership 
The Māori team was managed by Ernie Asher who had been a player on the 1908 and 1909 tours, and Wilf Davies.  
Travers Hardwick coached the team. Hardwick had toured Australia with the New Zealand national team in 1948 and 1952. 
The team was captained by Henry Maxwell, with George Turner serving as vice-captain.

Squad 
The Rugby League News published a Team Photo, Player Details (Age, Height and Weight) and Pen Portraits of the tourists.

Matches

Sources

References

New Zealand national rugby league team tours
Rugby league tour
New Zealand rugby league tour
Rugby league tours of Australia